Carlos Expósito Verdejo (born 11 July 1991 in Madrid) is a Spanish footballer who plays for Internacional de Madrid as a right-back.

External links

1991 births
Living people
Spanish footballers
Footballers from Madrid
Association football defenders
Segunda División players
Segunda División B players
Tercera División players
Primera Federación players
Real Madrid C footballers
AD Alcorcón footballers
Atlético Levante UD players
Recreativo de Huelva players
CP Cacereño players
Marbella FC players
CD Toledo players
CD Atlético Baleares footballers
Real Balompédica Linense footballers
CF Talavera de la Reina players
Internacional de Madrid players